Second person can refer to the following: 

 A grammatical person (you, your and yours in the English language)
 Second-person narrative, a perspective in storytelling
 Second Person (band), a trip-hop band from London
 God the Son, the Second Person of the Christian Trinity

Related
 First person (disambiguation)
 Third person (disambiguation)